Rain Dances is the fifth studio album by English progressive rock band Camel. It was released in 1977 on Gama Records/Decca Records, and brought a major change to the band's lineup, by replacing bassist Doug Ferguson with ex-Caravan member Richard Sinclair and by adding saxophonist Mel Collins, formerly of King Crimson.

Track listing
Side one
"First Light" (Peter Bardens, Andrew Latimer) – 4:59
 Andrew Latimer – 6- and 12-string guitars, pan pipes
 Mel Collins – alto saxophone
 Pete Bardens – Minimoog, string synthesizer
 Richard Sinclair – bass
 Andy Ward – drums, ocarina, teeth, cheek, Turkish ring
"Metrognome" (Bardens, Latimer) – 4:07
 Andrew Latimer – guitar
 Mel Collins – tenor saxophone
 Pete Bardens – electric piano, organ, string synthesizer
 Richard Sinclair – bass, lead vocals
 Andy Ward – drums, percussion, money
"Tell Me" (Bardens, Latimer) – 4:04
 Andrew Latimer – fretless bass, backing vocals, flute
 Mel Collins – soprano and bass clarinets
 Pete Bardens – electric piano, Minimoog
 Richard Sinclair – lead and harmony vocals
 Andy Ward – finger cymbals, glockenspiel
"Highways of the Sun" (Bardens, Latimer) – 4:25
 Andrew Latimer – acoustic guitar, lead vocals
 Mel Collins – soprano and bass flutes
 Pete Bardens – acoustic and electric pianos, organ, Minimoog, string synthesizer
 Richard Sinclair – bass, wicket keeper
 Andy Ward – drums, percussion, liquid Boo Bams

Side two
"Unevensong" (Bardens, Latimer, Andy Ward) – 5:22
 Andrew Latimer – guitar, second lead vocals
 Pete Bardens – electric piano, clavinet, Minimoog, string synthesizers, car horns
 Richard Sinclair – bass, first lead vocals
 Andy Ward – drums, percussion, Rototoms
"One of These Days I'll Get an Early Night" (Bardens, Mel Collins, Latimer, Richard Sinclair, Ward) – 5:49
 Andrew Latimer – guitar
 Mel Collins – all saxophones
 Pete Bardens – electric piano
 Richard Sinclair – bass
 Andy Ward – drums, percussion, talking drum, smurd
 Martin Drover – trumpet
 Malcolm Griffiths – trombone
"Elke" (Latimer) – 4:20
 Andrew Latimer – fuzz guitar, acoustic and electric pianos, Minimoog, string synthesizers, flute
 Brian Eno – acoustic and electric pianos, Minimoog, bells
 Fiona Hibbert – harp
"Skylines" (Bardens, Latimer, Ward) – 4:17
 Andrew Latimer – feedback, 6- and 12-string, lead and rhythm guitars, bass, sore fingers
 Mel Collins – alto saxophone
 Pete Bardens – electric piano, Minimoog, string synthesizers
 Andy Ward – drums, Tunisian clay drum, swanee
 Martin Drover – flugelhorn
 Malcolm Griffiths – trombone
"Rain Dances" (Bardens, Latimer) – 2:47
 Andrew Latimer – pizzicato guitar, treated piano, glockenspiel, umbrellas
 Mel Collins – soprano saxophone, umbrellas
 Pete Bardens – Minimoog, string synthesizer, umbrellas 

CD bonus track
"Highways of the Sun" (Single edit) (Bardens, Latimer)

2009 Expanded & Remastered Edition
"Highways of the Sun" (Single version) – 4:00
"First Light" (Live; taken from BBC "Sight and Sound" in Concert - Golders Green Hippodrome, 22 September 1977) – 5:01
"Metrognome" (Live; taken from BBC "Sight and Sound" in Concert - Golders Green Hippodrome, 22 September 1977) – 4:55
"Unevensong" (Live; taken from BBC "Sight and Sound" in Concert - Golders Green Hippodrome, 22 September 1977) – 5:47
"Skylines" (Live; taken from BBC "Sight and Sound" in Concert - Golders Green Hippodrome, 22 September 1977) – 5:36
"Highways to the Sun" (Live; taken from BBC "Sight and Sound" in Concert - Golders Green Hippodrome, 22 September 1977) – 4:59
"One of These Days I'll Get an Early Night" (Live; taken from BBC "Sight and Sound" in Concert - Golders Green Hippodrome, 22 September 1977) – 4:12

Personnel
Camel
 Andrew Latimer – electric guitar, acoustic guitar, 12-string guitar, panpipes, flute, backing vocals; fretless bass on "Tell Me"; electric piano, Minimoog, synthesizer and fuzz guitar on "Elke"; piano on "Elke" and "Rain Dances"; rhythm guitar and bass on "Skylines"; glockenspiel on "Rain Dances"; lead vocals on "Highways of the Sun" and "Unevensong"
 Peter Bardens – organ, piano, electric piano, Minimoog, synthesizer, Hohner Clavinet
 Andy Ward – drums, percussion, ocarina, glockenspiel, talking drum
 Richard Sinclair – bass; lead vocals on "Metrognome", "Tell Me" and "Unevensong"
 Mel Collins – alto saxophone, tenor saxophone, soprano saxophone, clarinet, bass flute, brass arrangements

Additional personnel
 Martin Drover – trumpet on "One of These Days I'll Get an Early Night", flugelhorn on "Skylines"
 Malcolm Griffiths – trombone on "One of These Days I'll Get an Early Night" and "Skylines"
 Brian Eno – Minimoog, electric piano, piano on "Elke"
 Fiona Hibbert – harp on "Elke"

Production

 Dave Hutchins – engineer
 Paul Henry – sleeve design
 Bob Searles – illustration

Release details
 1977, UK, Gama/Decca, Release date: September 1977, LP
 1991, UK/GER, Deram, Release date: 26 August, CD (w. bonus track)
 2004, UK, London 8207252, Release date: 2 February 2004, CD (remastered version)

Charts

References

External links 
 Camel - Rain Dances (1977) album review by Matthew Plichta, credits & releases at AllMusic.com
 Camel - Rain Dances (1977) album releases & credits at Discogs.com
 Camel - Rain Dances (1977) album review by Archibald C. Burke, credits & user reviews at SputnikMusic.com
 Camel - Rain Dances (1977) album to be listened as stream at Play.Spotify.com

1977 albums
Camel (band) albums
Albums produced by Rhett Davies
Deram Records albums